James Edward Derbyshire (27 May 1882 – 1945) was an English footballer who played in the Football League for Blackburn Rovers.

References

1882 births
1945 deaths
English footballers
Association football defenders
English Football League players
Turton F.C. players
Blackburn Rovers F.C. players
Nelson F.C. players
Darwen F.C. players